Abebe Mekonnen (born 16 October 1964) is an Ethiopian long-distance runner.

Mekkonen was the winner of the 93rd Boston Marathon in 1989.  He also competed for Ethiopia in the 1992 Olympics and 1996 Olympics in the marathon. He did not finish in the 1992 games and finished 81st with a time of 2:29:45 in the 1996 Summer Olympics.

Mekonnen has the most sub 2:15 marathons of anyone: 32 in all. When he ran his 28th sub-2:15 marathon he broke the record set by Bill Rodgers.

His best time was 2:07:35 in the 1988 Beijing Marathon, which is still course record.

Achievements

See also 
List of winners of the Boston Marathon

References

External links 
 
 
 

1964 births
Living people
Athletes (track and field) at the 1992 Summer Olympics
Athletes (track and field) at the 1996 Summer Olympics
Olympic athletes of Ethiopia
Boston Marathon male winners
Paris Marathon male winners
Ethiopian male marathon runners
African Games silver medalists for Ethiopia
African Games medalists in athletics (track and field)
Athletes (track and field) at the 1987 All-Africa Games
Friendship Games medalists in athletics
20th-century Ethiopian people
21st-century Ethiopian people